The César Award is France's national film award. Recipients are selected by the members of the Académie des Arts et Techniques du Cinéma. The following are the recipients of the Honorary César award since 1976.

Recipients

1970s

1980s

1990s

2000s

2010s

External links 
 
 Honorary César at AlloCiné

Honorary Cesar
 
Lifetime achievement awards
Cesar